Communities in the province of British Columbia, Canada can include incorporated municipalities, Indian reserves, unincorporated communities or localities. Unincorporated communities can be further classified as recreational or urban.

Indian reserves 

Indian Reserves are administered under a separate legal designation from other communities. Under the division of powers in Canadian law - First Nations (formally and still legally defined as Indians) fall under federal jurisdiction, while non-Aboriginal communities are part of a separate system that is largely the responsibility of the Provinces.

Unincorporated communities

Communities 
A community in British Columbia is an "unincorporated populated place".
British Columbia has 889 communities, some of which are located within municipalities or Indian reserves.

108 Mile Ranch
141 Mile House
150 Mile House
70 Mile House
93 Mile
Abbotsford (former Village of Abbotsford, now within the City of Abbotsford)
Aberdeen (within the City of Abbotsford)
Aberdeen (within the City of Kamloops)
Adams Lake
Agassiz (within the District of Kent)
Ainsworth Hot Springs
Alberni (within the City of Port Alberni)
Albert Head (within the District of Metchosin)
Albion (within the District of Maple Ridge)
Aldergrove (within Township of Langley)
Alexandria
Alexis Creek
Aleza Lake
Alkali Lake
Almond Gardens
Alpine Meadows (within the Resort Municipality of Whistler)
Altamont
Altona
Ambleside
Anahim Lake
Anglemont
Anniedale (within City of Surrey)
Annis
Appledale
Arbutus Ridge (within the City of Vancouver)
Argenta
Arnold (within the cities of Abbotsford and Chilliwack)
Arras
Arrow Creek
Arrowview Heights
Ashton Creek
Atchelitz (within the City of Chilliwack)
Athalmer
Atlin
Atluck
Austin Heights (within the City of Coquitlam)
Australian
Avola
Azu Ski Village
Baldonnel
Baldy Hughes
Balfour
Balmoral
Balmoral Beach
Bamfield
Bankeir
Barkerville
Barlow Creek
Barnet (within the City of Port Moody)
Barnhartvale (within the City of Kamloops)
Barnston Island
Barrett Lake
Barrowtown (within the City of Abbotsford)
Batchelor Hills (within the City of Kamloops)
Baynes Lake
Beach Grove (within the Corporation of Delta)
Beachcomber Bay (within the City of Vernon)
Bear Lake
Bear Lake
Beaver Cove
Beaver Creek
Beaver Falls 
Beaver Lake (within the District of Saanich)
Beaver Point
Beaverdell
Beaverley
Bella Bella
Bella Coola
Belmont Park (within the City of Colwood)
Benvoulin (within the City of Kelowna)
Bestwick
Big Bar Creek
Big Eddy
Birch Island
Birchland Manor (within the City of Port Coquitlam)
Black Creek
Black Pines
Blackpool
Blaeberry
Blewett 
Blind Bay
Blind Channel
Blubber Bay
Blucher Hall
Blue River
Blueberry Creek
Blueridge (within the District of North Vancouver)
Bonnet Hill (within the City of Prince George)
Bonnington Falls
Boothroyd
Boston Bar
Boswell
Bouchie Lake
Boundary Bay (within the Corporation of Delta)
Bowser
Brackendale (within the District of Squamish)
Bradner (within the City of Abbotsford)
Braemar Heights (within the City of Colwood)
Braeside
Brandon
Brentwood Bay
Brentwood Park (within the City of Burnaby)
Brew Bay
Bridal Falls
Bridesville
Bridge Lake
Bridgeview (within City of Surrey)
Brigade Lake
Brighouse (within the City of Richmond)
Brilliant
Brisco
Britannia Beach
British Properties (within the District of West Vancouver)
Broadmoor (within the City of Richmond)
Broadview (within the City of Salmon Arm)
Brocklehurst (within the City of Kamloops)
Brookswood (within Township of Langley)
Brouse 
Brunette Creek (within the City of New Westminster)
Buckhorn
Buckingham Heights (within the City of Burnaby)
Buckinghorse River
Buckley Bay
Buffalo Creek
Buick
Burkeville (within the City of Richmond)
Burnaby Heights (within the City of Burnaby)
Burquitlam (within the City of Coquitlam)
Burton
Cadboro Bay (within the District of Saanich)
Caithness
Cameron Heights (within the City of Port Alberni)
Campbell Island
Campbellton
Canim Lake
Canoe (within the City of Salmon Arm)
Canyon
Canyon Alpine
Canyon Heights (within the District of North Vancouver)
Capilano Highlands (within the District of North Vancouver)
Capitol Hill (within the City of Burnaby)
Cariboo (within the City of Coquitlam)
Carrs (within the District of Lake Country)
Cascade Heights (within the City of Burnaby)
Casino 
Cassidy
Cassin (within the City of Coquitlam)
Castle Rock
Castledale
Caulfeild
Cawston
Caycuse
Cecil Lake
Cedar
Cedar Grove
Cedardale (within the District of West Vancouver)
Cedarside
Cedarvale
Celista
Chapman Camp
Charella Garden (within the City of Prince George)
Charlie Lake
Chase River (within the City of Nanaimo)
Cheakamus (within the District of Squamish)
Chemainus (within the Municipality of North Cowichan)
Cherry Creek
Cherry Creek
Cherryville
Chezacut
Chilanko Forks
Chilcotin Forest
Chineside (within the City of Coquitlam)
Christina Lake
Cinnabar Valley
Clairmont
Claybrick 
Clayburn (within the City of Abbotsford)
Clayhurst
Clearbrook (within the City of Abbotsford)
Cleveland Park (within the District of North Vancouver)
Coal Harbour
Coalmont
Cobble Hill
College Heights (within the City of Prince George)
Collettville
Colquitz (within the District of Saanich)
Columbia Gardens
Commodore Heights
Connaught Heights (within the City of New Westminster)
Coombe
Coombs
Cooper Creek 
Cordova Bay (within the District of Saanich)
Cortes Bay
Cove Cliff
Cowichan Bay
Cowichan Station
Coyle
Craigellachie
Cranberry
Cranberry Junction
Crawford Bay
Creighton Valley
Crescent (within City of Surrey)
Crescent Bay
Crescent Beach (within City of Surrey)
Crescent Beach
Crescent Valley
Crofton (within the Municipality of North Cowichan)
Cultus Lake
Cypress Park (within the District of West Vancouver)
Dallas (within the City of Kamloops)
D'Arcy
Darfield
Dartmoor (within the City of Coquitlam)
Dashwood
Davis Bay
Dease Lake
Decker Lake
Deep Bay
Deep Cove (within the District of North Saanich)
Deep Cove (within the District of North Vancouver)
Delbrook (in the District of North Vancouver)
Delkatla
Denman Island
Dentville (within the District of Squamish)
Departure Bay (within the City of Nanaimo)
Deroche
Dewdney
Dodge Cove
Dog Creek
Dog Creek
Dogwood Valley
Doig River
Dokie Siding
Dollarton (within the District of North Vancouver)
Dolphin Beach
Dome Creek
Donald
Donald Landing
Douglas (within City of Surrey)
Douglas Lake
Driftwood Creek
Dry Gulch
Duck Range
Dufferin (within the City of Kamloops)
Dunbar-Southlands (within the City of Vancouver)
Dundarave (within the District of West Vancouver)
Dunkley
Dunster
Durieu
Eagle Bay
Eagle Creek
Eagle Harbour (within the District of West Vancouver)
Eagle Heights
Eagle Ridge (within the City of Coquitlam)
Eagle Run (within the District of Squamish)
East Kelowna (within the City of Kelowna)
East Osoyoos (within the Town of Osoyoos)
East Sooke
East Trail
East Wellington
Eastburn (within the City of Burnaby)
Eastgate
Eddontenajon
Edgewater
Edgewood
Egmont
Elgin (within City of Surrey)
Elko
Ellison
Elphinstone
Endako
Engen
Erickson
Errington
Esler
Essondale (within the City of Coquitlam)
Extension
Fairbridge
Fairfield (within the City of Chilliwack)
Fairfield
Fairview
Fairview (within the City of Vancouver)
Falkland
False Bay
Fanny Bay
Farmington
Fauquier
Fernridge (within Township of Langley)
Ferndale
Fernwood (located on Saltspring Island)
Field
Fife
Firvale
Flatrock
Floods (within the District of Hope)
Foreman
Forest Grove
Forest Hills (within the District of North Vancouver)
Forest Knolls (within Township of Langley)
Fort Babine
Fort Fraser
Fort Langley (within Township of Langley)
Fort Nelson (within the Northern Rockies Regional Municipality)
Fort Rupert
Fort Ware
François Lake
Fraser
Fraser Heights (within City of Surrey)
Fraser Mills (within the City of Coquitlam)
French Creek
Fulford Harbour
Gabriola
Galloway
Gambier Harbour
Gang Ranch
Ganges
Garden Bay
Garden Village (within the City of Burnaby)
Garibaldi Estates (within the District of Squamish)
Garnet Valley (within District of Summerland)
Gateway
Gellatly (within the District of West Kelowna)
Genelle
Germansen Landing
Gibson Creek
Gillies Bay
Gilpin
Gingolx
Gitwinksihlkw
Glade
Glen Valley (within Township of Langley)
Glen Vowell
Glenbank
Glenbrooke North
Glendale
Gleneagles (within the District of West Vancouver)
Gleneden (within the City of Salmon Arm)
Glenmerry (within the City of Trail)
Glenmore (within the District of West Vancouver)
Glenrosa (within the District of West Kelowna)
Gold Bridge
Goldstream (within City of Langford)
Goodlow
Gordon Head (within the District of Saanich)
Grand Haven
Grand Rapids
Grandview (within City of Surrey)
Grandview Bench
Grandview-Woodlands (within the City of Vancouver)
Granite
Grantham
Granthams Landing
Gray Creek
Greendale (within the City of Chilliwack)
Grindrod
Groundbirch
Hagensborg
Hagwilget
Haig (within the District of Hope)
Halfmoon Bay
Haney (within the District of Maple Ridge)
Happy Valley (within City of Langford)
Harbour Chines (within the City of Coquitlam)
Harbour Village (within the City of Coquitlam)
Harrison Mills
Harrogate
Harrop
Hart Highlands (within the City of Prince George)
Hartley Bay
Hasler Flat
Hastings-Sunrise (within the City of Vancouver)
Hatzic (within the District of Mission)
Hazelmere (within City of Surrey)
Hedley
Heffley Creek
Heriot Bay
Hilliers
Hills
Hixon
Holberg
Hollyburn
Honeymoon Bay
Hopetown
Hopkins Landing
Hornby Island
Horsefly
Horseshoe Bay (within the District of West Vancouver)
Hosmer
Hospital Hill (within the District of Squamish)
Huntingdon (within the City of Abbotsford)
Hupel
Huscroft
Hyde Creek
Inkaneep
Ioco (within the City of Port Moody)
Iskut
Island Cache (within the City of Prince George)
Jaffray
James Bay
Jeune Landing
Johnson Heights (within City of Surrey)
Johnsons Landing
Juniper Ridge
Juskatla
Kahntah (within the Northern Rockies Regional Municipality)
Kaleden
Keating (within the District of Central Saanich)
Keith-Lynn
Kelly Lake
Kelvin
Kemano
Kensington-Cedar Cottage (within the City of Vancouver)
Kerrisdale (within the City of Vancouver)
Kersley
Kettle Valley
Kilgard (within the City of Abbotsford)
Killarney (within the City of Vancouver)
Killiney Beach
Kingfisher
Kispiox
Kitamaat Village
Kitchener
Kitkatla
Kitsault
Kitseguecla
Kitsilano (within the City of Vancouver)
Kitsumkalum
Kitwanga
Kleecoot
Kleena Kleene
Klemtu
Knutsford
Koch Siding.
Kokish
Koksilah
Kootenay Bay
Krestova
Kuldo
Kuskonook
Kyuquot
Lac la Hache
Ladner (within the Corporation of Delta)
Laidlaw
Lake Errock
Lake Hill (within the District of Saanich)
Lakelse Lake
Lakeview Heights (within the District of West Kelowna)
Lamming Mills
Lang Bay
Langdale
Lardeau
Laurentian Belaire (within the City of Coquitlam)
Lavington
Lax Kw'alaams
Laxgalts'ap
Lazo
Lebahdo
Lee Creek
Lemon Creek
Leo Creek
Lighthouse Point
Likely
Lincoln Park
Lindell Beach
Lister
Little Fort
Little River
Lone Butte
Lone Prairie
Longbeach.
Louis Creek
Lower China Creek
Lower Lonsdale
Lower Nicola
Lower Post
Lund
Lust Subdivision
Luxton (within City of Langford)
Lynn Valley
Lynnmour (within the District of North Vancouver)
Lynx Creek
Madeira Park
Magna Bay
Mahatta River
Maillardville
Malahat
Malakwa
Manning Park
Mansons Landing
Maple Bay (within the Municipality of North Cowichan)
Maplewood (within the District of North Vancouver)
Mara
Marguerite
Marigold (within the District of Saanich)
Marktosis
Marpole (within the City of Vancouver)
Martin Prairie
Mary Hill (within the City of Port Coquitlam)
Marysville
Mason Creek
Masset
Mayfair (within the City of Coquitlam)
Mayne Island
Mayook
McGregor
McKinley Landing (within the City of Kelowna)
McLeese Lake
McLeod Lake
McLure
Meadow Creek
Meadowbrook (within the City of Port Coquitlam)
Merville
Mesachie Lake
Metlakatla
Metrotown (within the City of Burnaby)
Mica Creek
Middle River
Middlegate (within the City of Burnaby)
Mill Bay
Milner (within Township of Langley)
Milnes Landing
Minstrel Island
Miracle Valley
Mirror Lake
Mission (former Town of Mission City, now within the District of Mission)
Miworth
Moberly Lake
Monte Creek
Monte Lake
Moose Heights
Mount Currie
Mount Lehman (within the City of Abbotsford)
Mount Pleasant (within the City of Vancouver)
Mountain Station
Moyie
Murrayville (within Township of Langley)
Myrtle Point
Nanoose Bay
Naramata
Nass Camp
Nazko
New Aiyansh
New Brighton
New Settlement
Nicholson
Nicola
Nimpkish
Nimpo Lake
Norgate (within the District of North Vancouver)
North Bend
North Bulkley
North Campbell River
North Delta (within the Corporation of Delta)
North Galiano
North Kamloops (within the City of Kamloops)
North Lonsdale (within the City of North Vancouver)
North Nechako (within the City of Prince George)
North Poplar (within the City of Abbotsford)
Northfield (within the City of Nanaimo)
Northridge (within the District of Squamish)
Notch Hill
Nuchatlitz
Nukko Lake
Nursery
Oak Hills (within the City of Kamloops)
Oakridge (within the City of Vancouver)
Oasis
Ocean Falls
Ocean Grove
Ocean Park (within City of Surrey)
Okanagan Centre (within the District of Lake Country)
Okanagan Falls
Okanagan Landing (within the City of Vernon)
Okanagan Mission (within the City of Kelowna)
Olalla
Old Bella Bella
Old Fort
Old Fort Nelson (within the Northern Rockies Regional Municipality)
Old Massett
Oliver's Landing
Ootischenia
Opitsaht
Osborn (within the Municipality of North Cowichan)
Osprey Lake
Otter Point
Otway (within the City of Prince George)
Oxford Heights (within the City of Port Coquitlam)
Oyama (within the District of Lake Country)
Oyster River
Paldi
Palling
Panorama Ridge (within the City of Surrey)
Park Royal (within the District of West Vancouver)
Park Siding
Parkdale Gardens (within the Corporation of Delta)
Passmore
Paterson
Pavilion
Pemberton Heights (within the District of North Vancouver)
Pender Island
Perow
Perry Siding
Phillips Arm
Pinantan Lake
Pine Valley
Pineview
Pitt Meadows
Pixie Beach (within the District of Lake Country)
Playmor Junction
Pleasantside (within the City of Port Moody)
Popkum
Poplar Grove
Port Essington
Port Guichon (within the Corporation of Delta)
Port Hammond (within the District of Maple Ridge)
Port Kells (within the City of Surrey)
Port Mann (within the City of Surrey)
Port Mellon
Port Renfrew
Port Washington
Powers Addition (within the City of Kamloops)
Prairie Valley (within District of Summerland)
Prespatou
Pritchard
Procter
Progress
Promontory (within the City of Chilliwack)
Prospect Lake (within the District of Saanich)
Qualicum Bay
Quathiaski Cove
Quatsino
Queens Bay
Queens Park (within the City of New Westminster)
Queensborough (within the City of New Westminster)
Quesnel View
Quick
Quinsam
Ranch Park
Ranchero
Raspberry
Rayleigh (within the City of Kamloops)
Red Bluff
Red Rock
Redroofs
Reid Lake
Remo
Renfrew-Collingwood (within the City of Vancouver)
Rich Bar
Ridgedale (within the City of Abbotsford)
Riley Park (within the City of Vancouver)
Riondel
Riske Creek
River Jordan
River Springs
Rivervale (within the City of Trail)
Roberts Creek
Robson
Rock Creek
Rockyview (within the City of Cranbrook)
Rolla
Rose Lake
Rosedale (within the City of Chilliwack)
Ross Spur
Royal Oak (within the District of Saanich)
Royston
Rumble Beach
Ruskin (within the District of Maple Ridge)
Rutland (within the City of Kelowna)
Ryder Lake (within the City of Chilliwack)
Saanichton (within the District of Central Saanich)
Sahali (within the City of Kamloops)
Sahara Heights (within the City of Port Alberni)
Sahtlam
Salmon Arm (former Village of Salmon Arm, now within the City of Salmon Arm)
Salmon Beach
Salmon Valley
Saltair
Saltery Bay
Sandspit
Sandwick
Sandy Cove (within the District of West Vancouver)
Sapperton (within the City of Surrey)
Saratoga Beach
Sardis (within the City of Chilliwack)
Saseenos
Savona
Scotch Creek
Seafair (within the City of Richmond)
Secret Cove
Selma Park
Sentinel Hill (within the District of West Vancouver)
Seton Portage
Sevenoaks (within the District of Saanich)
Sewell Inlet
Seymour Arm
Seymour Heights (within the District of North Vancouver)
Shady Valley (within the City of Prince George)
Shalalth
Shaughnessy (within the City of Vancouver)
Shawnigan Lake
Shelley
Shelter Point
Sheraton
Shoreacres
Shuswap
Shutty Bench
Silver Creek (within the District of Hope)
Silver Valley (within the District of Maple Ridge)
Silverhill (within the District of Mission)
Sinclair Mills
Sirdar
Six Mile Point
Skidegate
Slesse Park
Sliammon
Slocan Park
Soda Creek
Sointula
Solsqua
Somenos (within the Municipality of North Cowichan)
Sorrento
South Cambie
South Canoe (within the City of Salmon Arm)
South Dawson
South Fort George (within the City of Prince George)
South Hazelton
South Lakeside
South Poplar (within the City of Abbotsford)
South Shalalth
South Slocan
South Slope (within the City of Burnaby)
South Sumas (within the City of Chilliwack)
South Taylor
South Wellington
Southarm (within the City of Richmond)
Southbank
Spences Bridge
Spillimacheen
Springhouse
Sproat Lake
Squilax
St. Eugene Mission
St. Ives
St. Joseph Mission
Stave Falls (within the District of Mission)
Steelhead (within the District of Mission)
Stellako
Steveston (within the City of Richmond)
Stillwater
Stoner
Stories Beach
Straiton (within the City of Abbotsford)
Strathcona (within the City of Vancouver)
Strathnaver
Strawberry Hill (within the City of Surrey)
Strawberry Vale (within the District of Saanich)
Stuie
Stump Lake
Sturdies Bay
Sugarcane
Sullivan (within the City of Surrey)
Sullivan Heights (within the City of Burnaby)
Summit Lake (within the Northern Rockies Regional Municipality)
Sun Valley (within the City of Coquitlam)
Suncrest (within the City of Burnaby)
Sunningdale (within the City of Trail)
Sunnybrae
Sunnyside
Sunset (within the City of Vancouver)
Sunset Beach (within the District of West Vancouver)
Sunset Prairie
Sunshine Bay
Sunshine Hills (within the Corporation of Delta)
Sunshine Valley
Surrey Centre
Ta Ta Creek
Tachie
Tadanac
Taghum
Tamarisk (within the Resort Municipality of Whistler)
Tappen
Tarrys
Tchesinkut Lake
Telegraph Creek
Ten Mile Lake
Tête Jaune Cache
Thetis Island
Thompson (within the City of Richmond)
Thornhill
Thrums
Tillicum (within the District of Saanich)
Tintagel
Tlell
Topley
Topley Landing
Trêpanier
Traders Cove
Tranquille
Trinity Valley
Trout Creek
Trout Lake
Tsawwassen
Tsawwassen Beach (within the Corporation of Delta)
Tulameen
Tumbler Ridge
Turtle Valley
Two Mile
Two Rivers
Tynehead (within the City of Surrey)
Tzouhalem (within the Municipality of North Cowichan)
Union Bay
University Hill
Upper China Creek
Upper Fraser
Upper Halfway
Upper Lynn (within the District of North Vancouver)
Usk
Valleycliffe
Valleyview (within the City of Kamloops)
Vallican
Van Anda
Vanway (within the City of Prince George)
Vavenby
Vedder Crossing (within the City of Chilliwack)
Victoria-Fraserview (within the City of Vancouver)
Vinsulla
Walhachin
Walnut Grove (within the Township of Langley)
Waneta Junction (within the City of Trail)
Wardner
Wasa
Websters Corners (within the District of Maple Ridge)
Wellington (within the City of Nanaimo)
Wells
West Bay
West Bench
West End (within the City of New Westminster)
West End (within the City of Vancouver)
West Heights (within the District of Mission)
West Lynn (within the District of North Vancouver)
West Midway
West Point Grey (within the City of Vancouver)
West Trail (within the City of Trail)
Westbank (within the District of West Kelowna)
Westholme (within the Municipality of North Cowichan)
Westmount
Westridge (within the City of Burnaby)
Westside
Westsyde (within the City of Kamloops)
Westview
Westwold
Wet'suwet'en Village
Whisky Creek
Whistler Creek (within the Resort Municipality of Whistler)
White Lake
Whonnock (within the District of Maple Ridge)
Whyac
Whytecliff (within the District of West Vancouver)
Wildwood
Wiley
Williams Beach
Willingdon Heights (within the City of Burnaby)
Willow Point
Willow River
Willowbrook (within the Township of Langley)
Wilmer
Wilson Creek
Windermere
Windsor Park (within the District of North Vancouver)
Winfield (within the District of Lake Country)
Winlaw
Winter Harbour
Wonowon
Woodhaven
Woodlands
Woodpecker
Woodsdale (within the District of Lake Country)
Woss
Wycliffe
Wynndel
Yaculta
Yahk
Yale (within the District of North Vancouver) nort
Yarksis
Yarrow (within the City of Chilliwack)
Ymir
Youbou
Yuquot

Recreational communities 
A recreational community in British Columbia is an "unincorporated place with seasonal or year-round services, accommodation and amenities associated primarily with recreational or leisure activities". British Columbia has 11 communities that are classified as recreational communities.

Apex Mountain
Bear Mountain
Big White
Blackcomb (within the Resort Municipality of Whistler)
Fairmont Hot Springs
Hemlock Valley
Kicking Horse
Mount Baldy
Mount Washington
North Star
Panorama
Silver Star
Tobiano
Whistler (within the Resort Municipality of Whistler)

Urban communities 
An urban community in British Columbia is a "separately named area within the limits of an incorporated municipality". British Columbia has 10 communities that are classified as urban communities.

Cloverdale (within the City of Surrey)
Fleetwood (within the City of Surrey)
Guildford (within the City of Surrey)
Kinnaird (former village, now within the City of Castlegar)
Matsqui (within the City of Abbotsford)
Nechako (within the District Municipality of Kitimat)
Newton (within the City of Surrey)
South Surrey (within the City of Surrey)
Whalley (within the City of Surrey)

Localities 
A locality in British Columbia is a "named place or area, with or without a scattered population". British Columbia has 556 localities, not including those that have been abandoned or are classified as former localities.

105 Mile House
111 Mile House
114 Mile House
12 Mile
122 Mile House
127 Mile House
40 Mile Flats
Agate
Ahousat
Albas
Albreda
Alice Arm
Alice Siding
Allenby
Allison Lake
Alta Lake (within the Resort Municipality of Whistler)
Alvin
Anaconda
Anvil Island
Anzac
Applegrove 
Ardmore
Arrow Park
Arrowhead
Aspen Grove
Atnarko
Attachie
Baker
Baker Creek
Bamberton
Bastion Bay
Bear Creek
Bear Flat
Beasley
Beaton
Beatton Ranch
Beaver Pass House
Becher House
Bell II
Bennett
Benson Lake
Beresford
Beryl Prairie
Bessborough
Bevan
Big Bay
Big Creek
Big Lake Ranch
Billings 
Billings Bay
Birchdale
Birken
Black Creek
Blackloam
Blackwater
Bliss Landing
Bloedel
Blue Springs
Boat Basin
Boat Harbour
Bob Quinn Lake
Bold Point
Bonaparte
Boring Ranch
Boston Flats
Boulder City
Boundary Falls
Bowen Bay
Brady Ranch
Braeloch
Bralorne
Brem River
Brexton
Briar Ridge
Broman Lake
Brookmere
Brunswick Beach
Buccaneer Bay
Bulkley House
Bull River
Cahilty
Callison Ranch
Camborne
Camp Artaban
Camp McKinney
Campbell Creek
Canford
Canyon Hot Springs
Carlin
Carlson
Carmi
Carnaby
Carrolls Landing 
Carson
Cascade
Ceepeecee
Chamiss Bay
Chapmans
Charlotte Lake
Chasm
Chaumox
Cheam View
Cheekye
Cheslatta
Chetarpe
Chinook Cove
Choate
Chopaka
Christian Valley
Chu Chua
Church House
Chute Lake
Cinema
Clapperton
Clayoquot
Clemretta
Clo-oose
Coal River
Cody
Cokato
Coldspring House
Colleymount
Copper Creek
Corbin
Corra Linn
Cottonwood
Coutlee
Cowans Point
Cracroft
Creekside
Crescent Spur
Criss Creek
Crowsnest
Croydon
Cumshewa
Curzon
Dadens
Danskin
Darrell Bay
Dawsons Landing
Days Ranch
Deadwood
Deep Creek
Deer Park 
Deerholme
Defot
Deka Lake
Devine
Doe River
Dog Creek
Doriston
Dorreen
Dugan Lake
Duncan Bay
Dunsmuir
Eagle Bluff
Earls Cove
East Arrow Park
East Gate
East Pine
Eastbourne
Echo Bay
Ecoole
Eddy
Edelweiss
Eholt
Ekins Point
Elephant Crossing
Elk Bay
Elk Prairie
Engineer
Enterprise
Erie
Esperanza
Estevan Point
Exeter
Exlou
Fair Harbour
Farrell Creek
Federal Ranch
Fellers Heights
Ferguson
Fifth Cabin
Fintry
Fireside
Five Mile
Flathead
Flathead
Fontas
Forde
Forestdale
Fort Steele
Fosthall
Fountain
Fountain Valley
Fourth Cabin
Fowler
Furry Creek
Galena Bay
Garibaldi
Gates
Genoa Bay
George River
Georgetown Mills
Gifford (within the City of Abbotsford)
Giscome
Gitanyow (within the Gitanyow 1 Indian Reserve)
Glen Lake
Glenannan
Glenemma
Glenlily
Glenora
Glentanna
Good Hope Lake
Gordon River
Gramsons
Granduc
Granite Bay
Grasmere
Grassy Plains
Great Central
Greata
Gundy
Haina 
Halfway Ranch
Hall
Hanceville
Hardwicke Island
Harmac
Headquarters
Health Bay
Hells Gate
Hesquiat
Hickethier Ranch
Hillcrest
Hippa
Hiusta Meadow
Hkusam
Holmwood
Homfray Creek
Hopington
Hot Springs Cove
Howser
Hullcar
Hunts Inlet
Hydraulic
Hyland Post
Hyland Ranch
Ingenika Mine
Irvines Landing
Isle Pierre
Jacksons
Jade City
Jellicoe
Jersey
Jesmond
Jura
Kaisun (Haida village)
Kanaka Bar
Keats Island
Kedleston
Keithley Creek
Kelly Lake
Kendrick Camp
Kerr Creek
Kildonan
Kilkerran
Kimsquit
Kingcome
Kingcome Inlet
Kingsgate
Kiusta
Kleindale
Kobes
Kootenay Crossing
Kragmont
'Ksan
Kung 
Lac Le Jeune
Lake Kathlyn
Laketon
Larsons Landing
Lawnhill
Leechtown
Lees Corner
Lejac
Lemoray
Lexau Ranch
Liard River
Lily Lake
Lindell
Lindeman
Lockeport
Longworth
Loon Lake
Loos
Lucas
Lucerne
Lumberton
Mabel Lake
Macalister
Magnum Mine
Mahood Falls
Makinson.
Manson Creek
Mapes
Marblehead
Marilla
Marron Valley
Marshall School Junction
Matilpi
McCulloch
McDame
McDonald's Landing
McGillivray
McGuire
McKearney Ranch
McLean Ranch
McNab Creek
Meachen
Meadows
Meem Quam Leese
Meldrum Creek
Meziadin Junction
Mile 62 1/2
Mill Bay
Millstream
Minaty Bay
Minto Landing
Miocene
Mitchell Bay
Moha
Montney
Morrissey
Mount Gardner
Mount Robson
Mud Bay
Mud Bay
Mud River
Muncho Lake
Murdale
Muskwa
Myra
Nahun
Namu
Narcosli Creek
Nelson Forks
Nelway
Nemaiah Valley
Nesters (within the Resort Municipality of Whistler)
New Clew
Newgate
Newlands
Niagara
Nimpkish Heights
Ninstints
Noralee
North Bonaparte
North Pine
Nulki
Ogden
Old Fort
Old Hogem
Old Remo
Old Town
Oona River
Ootsa Lake
Osland
Othello
Owen Bay
Owl Creek
Paradise Point
Paradise Valley
Parkland
Parson
Pass Creek
Paulson
Peejay
Pemberton Meadows
Pendleton Bay
Penny
Pinchi
Pinchi Lake
Pine Valley
Pinegrove
Pineview
Pink Mountain
Pioneer Mine
Pleasant Camp
Poplar Creek
Porcher Island
Port Albion 
Port Douglas
Port Neville
Porteau
Porter Landing
Porto Rico
Prairiedale
Premier
Premier Lake
Prophet River
Punchaw
Puntledge
Quesnel Forks
Quilchena
Rainy Hollow
Read Island
Red Pass
Red Rose
Redstone
Refuge Cove
Remac
Renata
Retallack
Rhone
Robson West
Rock Bay
Roe Lake
Rogers Pass
Roosville
Rose Harbour
Rose Prairie
Rosebery
Rosswood
Round Lake
Round Prairie
Roy
Ruby Creek
Rupert
Rykerts
Saloon
Sanca
Sandon
Saturna
Scotia Bay
Scott Cove
Seaford
Seaside Park
Seven Mile Corner
Sewall
Seymour Lake
Shannon Bay
Shawl Bay
Shearer Dale
Shearwater
Shere
Sheridan Lake
Sheslay
Shingle Creek
Shirley
Shoreholme
Shulus
Shushartie
Shuswap
Shuswap Falls
Sikanni Chief
Silica
Silver Creek
Silver River
Simpson Ranch
Sinkut River
Skedans
Skeena Crossing
Skidegate Landing
Skookumchuck 
Skookumchuck
Smith River
Snake River
South Bentinck
Spatsum
Sproatt
Spuzzum
Squeah
Squirrel Cove
Stanley
Steamboat
Stewardson Inlet
Stikine
Stillwater
Strachan Creek 
Streatham
Stuart Island
Sullivan Bay
Summit Lake
Summit Lake
Sunnyside (within the City of Surrey)
Sunrise Valley
Surge Narrows
Surprise
Sweetwater
Taft
Tahltan
Takla Landing
Taku
Takysie Lake
Tallheo
Tanu
Tatalrose
Tatla Lake
Tatlayoko Lake
Tatlow
Tatogga
Tatton
Teakerne Arm
Telachick
Telegraph Cove
Tetachuk
Theodosia Arm
Thompson Sound
Three Forks
Thurlow 
Thurston Harbour
Tipella
Toad River
Toby Creek
Tomslake
Towdystan
Tower Lake
Trutch
Tsay Keh Dene
Tulsequah
Tupper
Tuwanek
Twidwell Bend
Twin Creeks
Ulkatcho
Upper Cutbank
Valemount, British Columbia
Valley View
Vaucroft Beach
Vermilion Crossing
Vidette
Wagner Ranch
Warner Bay
Weewanie
Welcome Beach
Weneez
West Landing
Westbridge
Whaletown
Williams Landing
Williamsons Landing
Willow Valley
Willowbrook
Willowvale
Wilson Landing
Wingdam
Wistaria
Witset
Woodcock
Woodfibre
Woodmere
Woods Landing
Wright
Yaku
Yankee Flats
Yekooche
Yennadon
Yreka
Zamora
Zincton

Abandoned localities 
An abandoned locality in British Columbia is a "previously populated place with no current population; often a modern landmark in a remote location". British Columbia has 18 localities that are considered abandoned.

Alamo 
Anyox
Bear Camp
Bergs
Blakeburn
Boswell
Brunswick
Cariboo Meadows
Cassiar
Centreville
Copper Mountain
Gerrard
Hecate
Hendrix Lake
Margaret Bay
Nalos Landing
Phoenix
Tasu

Former localities 
A former locality in British Columbia is a "once-populated place with no current population or that is usually uninhabited". British Columbia recognizes eight places as former localities.

Ahbau
Anderson
Belleview
Ben-My-Chree
Cariboo (now Lamming Mills)
Ehatisaht
Franklin Camp
San Josef (also known as San Josef Bay)

Landings 
"Landings", formerly classed as "steamer landings" are found along coastal BC an on certain inland waterways and lakes. They were often associated with mining and logging camps or fish canneries, or local agricultural settlements.
Jedway
Kootenay Landing

Company towns 
Company towns were once common in British Columbia. Many were large, but never had municipal government and were largely located on company-owned land. A few such as Granisle, Tumbler Ridge and Wells became municipalities, while others have become ghost towns. Among the largest were Anyox, Bralorne, Ocean Falls, Cassiar, Gold Harbour (Tasu) and Kitsault.

See also 

List of municipalities in British Columbia
Demographics of British Columbia
List of canneries in British Columbia
List of census agglomerations in British Columbia
List of designated places in British Columbia
List of ghost towns in British Columbia
List of Haida villages
:Category:Nisga'a villages
List of place names in Canada of aboriginal origin
List of population centres in British Columbia
List of regional district electoral areas in British Columbia

Notes

References 

Communities

de:Liste der Gemeinden in British Columbia